The 1980 Southern Illinois Salukis football team was an American football team that represented Southern Illinois University (now known as Southern Illinois University Carbondale) in the Missouri Valley Conference (MVC) during the 1980 NCAA Division I-A football season.  Under fifth-year head coach Rey Dempsey, the team compiled a 3–8 record. The team played its home games at McAndrew Stadium in Carbondale, Illinois.

Schedule

Roster

References

Southern Illinois
Southern Illinois Salukis football seasons
Southern Illinois Salukis football